George Gao may refer to:

 George F. Gao (born 1961), Chinese microbiologist
 George Gao (erhu) (born 1967), Chinese erhu player

See also
 George Kao (1912–2008), Chinese American author, translator, and journalist